Bonthapally is a census town in Sangareddy district of the Indian state of Telangana.
It is famous for the Veerabhadra Swamy temple. Bonthapalli.in around this lot of pharmaceutical companies are established here like Hetero Drugs, Neuland Laboratories, Granuels India, Honour Lab and Sundram Fasteners, iron powder etc.

Geography 

Accessibility
Bonthapally is 35 km from Hyderabad and can be reached by buses.

Neighborhoods
Gummadidala, Annaram, Domadugu , Dundigal

References 

Cities and towns in Sangareddy district